MiMi Aun (born 1968) is a Burmese-American engineer and project manager at NASA's Jet Propulsion Laboratory (JPL). She is a lead engineer on the Mars Helicopter Ingenuity, the first extraterrestrial aircraft.

Aung was born in the United States, where her parents met, though her family returned to Burma when she was 2 years old. After spending her childhood in Burma and Malaysia, Aung returned to the United States at age 16 and studied engineering at the University of Illinois at Urbana-Champaign, where she received her Bachelor's and master's degrees. In 1990, she joined JPL.
 
On February 18, 2021, Ingenuity arrived on Mars and on April 19 took its first 39-second flight. Aung said, it “was an incredible moment” and “This morning our dream came true.” The flight is being compared to the first flight in 1903 of the Wright brothers' airplane, a small piece of which was carried by the helicopter to Mars.

Early life and family 
MiMi Aung's parents met in the United States when they were studying for their doctorates. Her mother, Hla Hla Sein, was the first woman from Myanmar to earn a doctoral degree in mathematics. Her father, Thein Aung, received his doctorate in chemistry. Aung was born in Illinois and returned to Myanmar with her parents when she was two and a half years old. When she was 11, the family moved to Malaysia, where she attended St. Christopher's School. At the age of 16, her parents arranged for her to return to the U.S. and stay with some friends in Illinois while she finished her education. She had to go without the rest of her family because her two younger sisters were not born in the U.S. and so could not emigrate there. Aung is married and has two children.

Education 
By the time she was 16 years old, Aung knew she loved math, but her parents wanted her to have a practical education, so she studied electrical engineering at the University of Illinois at Urbana–Champaign, where she earned her bachelor's degree, followed by a master's degree in 1990. Her master's thesis dealt with communications and signal processing. During her master's program one of her professors mentioned JPL's work in deep space exploration and its relationship to signal processing. She decided to interview with JPL.

Research and career 

Aung joined JPL in 1990, where she has worked on various projects related to spaceflight and the NASA Deep Space Network (DSN).

Deep Space Network 
She started her career working in the Radio Frequency and Microwave Subsystems Section of the DSN, where she developed and tested algorithms for the Block V Receiver. She deployed the digital receiver at each of the world's three DSN complexes, before working on monopulse radar systems. These systems were used in combination with the 34-meter antennas for the DSN. She worked on the 240-GHz radiometer for the Earth Orbiting System Microwave Limb Sounder.

Her next project involved the StarLight two-spacecraft interferometer, for which she designed the autonomous formation radio frequency flying sensor. She was selected as the project element manager of the Terrestrial Planet Finder (TPF)'s formation flying program., but after funding for the TPF was indefinitely delayed in 2006, the project was postponed and was eventually formally canceled in 2011.

In 2003, Aung was made technical group supervisor of the Guidance, Navigation, and Control Sensors Group. In this capacity she created sensor technologies for spaceflight missions. She became increasingly interested in autonomous space exploration and was made manager of the section in 2010. She was also a member of the Psyche spacecraft project team. In 2013 she became Deputy Manager of the Autonomous Systems Division.

Mars helicopter project 

Since 2015, Aung has been the lead for Mars helicopter technology demonstration development and oversees the diverse team that designed, built, tested and flew Ingenuity. Other team members include chief engineer Bob Balaram, originally from India, and chief pilot Håvard Grip, originally from Norway.

The atmosphere on Mars is only 1% of the atmospheric density on Earth, so a key question was how to generate enough lift for flight. The helicopter had to be very light-weight, and its blades had to be able to spin much faster than they would need to do on Earth. In addition, the helicopter could not be controlled by someone on Earth because radio signals take too long to get to Mars. So engineers at JPL equipped Ingenuity with a computerized system that allows it to stabilize itself and navigate on its own.

The first flight tests of the Mars Helicopter took place within the JPL space simulator in early 2019. The total cost of the helicopter is around $23 million, and it weighs less than 1.8 kg. The helicopter was attached to the belly of the Perseverance rover and launched from Cape Canaveral in  Florida on July 30, 2020, as part of NASA's Mars 2020 mission. The rover successfully landed in Jezero Crater on Mars on February 18, 2021, and two days later, JPL received its first status report from Ingenuity via the Mars Reconnaissance Orbiter. The helicopter was successfully deployed on April 3, 2021.

Ingenuity Mars flights 

On April 19, 2021, Ingenuity made the first powered, controlled flight by an aircraft on another planet. The team at JPL confirmed the flight succeeded after receiving data from the helicopter via the rover at 6:46 a.m. EDT (3:46 a.m. PDT).

The helicopter completed its technology demonstration after three successful flights. After that, the helicopter successfully performed additional experimental flights of incrementally farther distance and greater altitude.

Project Kuiper 

In July 2021, after 30 years at JPL, Aung left for a new role at Amazon's Project Kuiper.

Public engagement 
Aung is an expert for The Planetary Society and has written for Spaceflight. She was selected as one of the top 100 Women in the world by the BBC in 2019. Aung installed a webcam in the cleanroom at JPL that allowed the public to watch the development of the helicopter.

Aung was featured in the 2019 documentary Space Queens, along with several other women who were inspired by Apollo 11. The archival footage mentioned her involvement in the Mars 2020 project and, in particular, her work on the Ingenuity helicopter.

References

External links 
 NASA Mars Helicopter main webpage
 Helicopter project status
 Transcript of April 19, 2021, NASA press conference following first flight of Ingenuity
 Excerpt from documentary Space Queens

1968 births
Living people
American people of Burmese descent
Burmese engineers
NASA people
Jet Propulsion Laboratory faculty
American women engineers
Grainger College of Engineering alumni
21st-century American engineers
BBC 100 Women
20th-century women engineers
21st-century women engineers
20th-century American women
21st-century American women